Evonne Goolagong and Peggy Michel were the defending champions. They succeeded in extending their titles.

Seeds

Draw

Finals

Top half

Bottom half

External links
 1975 Australian Open – Women's draws and results at the International Tennis Federation

Women's Doubles
Australian Open (tennis) by year – Women's doubles